Pickfordiateuthis pulchella, the grass squid, is a species of squid in the family Loliginidae.
There was a single specimen of Pickfordiateuthis pulchella found when testing 246 specimens available in the area of Cabo de São Tomé (22°S) and Cananéia (25°S) at depths down to 200 meters from 1991 to 2005. The amount of this species peaked in different areas and were associated with distinct oceanographic conditions. They are often found in sea grass.

References

Squid
Molluscs described in 1953